Philip Laurence De Jager is the Weil-Granat Professor of Neurology in The Taub Institute for Research on Alzheimer's Disease and the Aging Brain and the Columbia Precision Medicine Initiative, both at Columbia University. He is also the director of the Center for Translational and Computational Neuroimmunology and the Multiple Sclerosis Center, the deputy director of the Taub Institute for Research on Alzheimer's Disease and the Aging Brain, and the chief of the Division of Neuroimmunology at Columbia University Irving Medical Center. He is noted for his research on the genetics of multiple sclerosis, for which he was awarded the Barancik Prize for Innovation in Multiple Sclerosis from the National MS Society in 2014. He was elected to the Association of American Physicians in 2021.

References

External links
Faculty page

American neurologists
Living people
Yale University alumni
Rockefeller University alumni
Cornell University alumni
Harvard Medical School alumni
Massachusetts Institute of Technology alumni
Harvard Medical School faculty
Columbia University faculty
Human geneticists
American geneticists
Year of birth missing (living people)